Tiger Lily is a fictional character in J. M. Barrie's 1904 play Peter Pan, or The Boy Who Wouldn't Grow Up, his 1911 novel Peter and Wendy, and their various adaptations.

History 
Tiger Lily is the daughter of Great Big Little Panther, the chief of the Piccanniny tribe, the fictional tribe of Native Americans living in Neverland. Barrie describes her as "a princess in her own right. The most beautiful of dusky Dianas and the belle of the Piccaninnies, coquettish, cold and amorous by turns." She is apparently old enough to be married, but refuses any suitors because of her feelings towards Peter. She is jealous of Wendy and Tinker Bell. Tiger Lily is kidnapped by Captain Hook and his pirates but is rescued by Peter Pan.

In other media
In the 1924 silent film Peter Pan, she is played by Anna May Wong.
In the Disney animated film of the same name, Captain Hook kidnaps Tiger Lily. This leads her father Big Chief to suspect that the Lost Boys were responsible. Hook leaves her to drown  at Skull Rock, but she is saved by Peter. He returns Tiger Lily to her tribe. While the tribe celebrates, Wendy becomes jealous of how Tiger Lily is flirting with Peter. Unlike other females in Neverland, Tiger Lily has no hostility towards Wendy herself. In the film, she has no lines (except for a brief "HELP" when she almost drowns provided by an uncredited voice actress).
In Cheshire Crossing, an older Tiger Lily is responsible for saving Wendy's life after she is stabbed, both having previously been romantically involved.
Tiger Lily appears in Peter Pan & the Pirates voiced by Cree Summer. She and her brother Hard-to-Hit sometimes tag along with and aid their friends Peter Pan, Tinker Bell, the Darling children and the Lost Boys on their many adventures.
In P. J. Hogan's 2003 film, she is played by Carsen Gray. In this version Tiger Lily is attracted to Wendy's younger brother John.
In Neverland, she is portrayed as Aaya, played by Q'orianka Kilcher. Aaya means "lily of tiger" in her native language.
Tiger Lily appears in Pan portrayed by Rooney Mara as love interest to a younger James Hook, a casting that created controversy due to claims of whitewashing.
Tiger Lily appears in Once Upon a Time portrayed by Sara Tomko. In this version, she started out as a fairy that was the fairy godmother to a baby Rumplestiltskin and a friend of the Blue Fairy. At some point, Tiger Lily gave up her fairy wings and relocated to Neverland where she had a history with Captain Hook.
She is the protagonist of the book Tiger Lily (2012) written by Jodi Lynn Anderson, told from the point of view of Tinker Bell.
Tiger Lily appears in Jonathan Green's role-playing gamebook Neverland: Here Be Monsters! as a playable character. This version is a fierce warrioress who rides a saber-toothed tiger as a steed and has proven herself in battle against the dinosaurs roaming Neverland.
Canadian Cree actress Alyssa Wapanatâhk will be portraying Tiger Lily in the film Peter Pan & Wendy, which is  set to premiere on Disney+ on April 28, 2023.

Reception

The character has attracted controversy due to racism and Native American stereotyping. 

Controversy also arose from the name given to her tribe, "Piccanniny" - a term which is now widely understood to be a racial slur.

References

External link

Theatre characters introduced in 1904
Peter Pan characters
Fictional Native American people
Fictional princesses
Fictional tribal chiefs
Child characters in film
Child characters in literature
Female characters in film
Female characters in literature
Female characters in television
Fictional Native American women